Pietro Bottaccioli (February 15, 1928 – January 22, 2017) was a Roman Catholic bishop.

Ordained to the priesthood in 1950, Bottaccioli served as bishop of the Roman Catholic Diocese of Gubbio, Italy, from 1989 to 2004.

Notes

1928 births
2017 deaths
People from Umbertide
20th-century Italian Roman Catholic bishops
21st-century Italian Roman Catholic bishops